The National Fluid Power Association (NFPA) is an American 501(c)6 industry trade association, founded in 1953. 

The NFPA's mission is to serve as a forum where all fluid power channel partners work together to advance fluid power technology, strengthen the fluid power industry, and foster members' success. NFPA members include more than 315 manufacturers of fluid power systems and components, fluid power distributors, suppliers to the fluid power industry, educators and researchers.

References

External links
 National Fluid Power Association
 Fluid Power Distributors Association
 Fluid Power Education Foundation
 Fluid Power Society

Hydraulic engineering organizations
Trade associations based in the United States